The Missouri Athletic Club's Downtown Clubhouse is a historic building having Renaissance Revival architecture. It was added to the National Register of Historic Places in 2007.

The Missouri Athletic Club has two clubhouses. The Downtown Clubhouse is located at 405 Washington Avenue, at the corner of Fourth Street, adjacent to the entrance to the Eads Bridge on the Missouri side. Designed by William B. Ittner, the clubhouse contains two restaurants, a ballroom, a barber shop, numerous private meeting rooms, a reading room, a billiard parlor, a rooftop deck, more than 75 guest rooms, and full-service athletic facilities. The athletic facilities include weight training, a pro shop, whirlpools, tanning beds, wet and dry saunas, trainers, pros, a masseuse, squash courts, racquetball courts, and handball courts.

References

Clubhouses on the National Register of Historic Places in Missouri
Landmarks of St. Louis
Men's club buildings
Renaissance Revival architecture in Missouri
National Register of Historic Places in St. Louis
Downtown St. Louis
Buildings and structures in St. Louis
2007 establishments in Missouri